The Kunlun School is a fictional martial arts school mentioned in several works of wuxia fiction. It is usually featured as a leading orthodox school in the jianghu / wulin (martial artists' community). It is named after the place where it is based, the Kunlun Mountains in western China, near modern Qinghai and Xinjiang provinces. Due to its geographical location, it was hardly known to martial artists in the jianghu before its rise to prominence.

History
The school's history traces back to the Zhou dynasty during the reign of King Wu. According to legend, its founders were the semi-mythological figures Laozi and Yuanshi Tianzun. The latter had 12 apprentices, who later became the Twelve Elders of Kunlun. Although Kunlun has its roots in Taoism, its members do not strictly follow Taoist customs and practices.

Kunlun's rise to prominence in the wulin (martial artists' community) only came after martial artists such as He Zudao made their names through their prowess in martial arts and by doing deeds of gallantry. He Zudao's successors led the school towards greater heights and achieving its status in the wulin as one of the leading orthodox school. The Kunlun School has the greatest strength and highest fame of all martial arts school in the western regions of China.

Kunlun has a strict code of conduct laid down for its members, who are forbidden from associating with people from unorthodox schools or else they will be expelled. Although Kunlun is considered to be a Taoist school just like Quanzhen and Wudang, it accepts students of both genders, and members are allowed to marry and start families, and are not bound by any regulation to maintain vegetarian diets.

One notable trait of the school is that it has a strong desire to become one of the superpowers in the wulin, and some members are especially extreme in their plans towards achieving this goal. In Jin Yong's The Heaven Sword and Dragon Saber, He Zudao and He Taichong are depicted as ruthless and ambitious individuals who wish to dominate the wulin. He Taichong, in particular, is depicted as a morally bankrupt villain who resorts to unscrupulous means in his attempt to seize hold of the Dragon Slaying Saber and use it against his rivals.

List of skills and martial arts
 Note: Although the skills listed here are entirely fictional, some may be based on or named after actual martial arts.

 Fist styles:
 Rising Dragon Fist
 Heaven Shaking Fist
 Thousand Dragons Playing in the Air Fist
 Palm styles:
 Hidden Dragon Rising to the Heavens Palm
 Crane Releasing and Dragon Capturing Hand
 Kunlun Palm
 Swan Falling Palm
 Finger styles:
 Crane Releasing and Dragon Capturing Finger
 Grappling styles:
 Apparently Sealed Hand
 Kunlun Wishful Hand
 Three Yin Hand
 Movement skills (qinggong):
 Three Twists of the Dragon in the Clouds
 Dragon Soars in the Nine Heavens
 Treading on Snow Without Leaving Prints

 Sword styles:
 Soaring Dragon in the Sky Swordplay
 Ten Styles of Life Taking Swift Sword
 Wishful Linked Life Taking Sword
 Swift Dragon Lightning Sword
 Silent and Scentless Sword Stroke
 Kunlun Swordplay
 Swift Lightning Swordplay
 Dual Swordplay
 Raining Flying Flowers Swordplay
 Saber styles:
 Infinite Hidden in the Depths Saber
 Projectile weapon skills:
 Shower of Flowers
 Inner energy skills:
 Mystical Heaven Infinite Skill
 Vajra Prajñā Divine Skill
 Nine Dragons Soaring in the Sky Sutra
 Battle formations:
 Winter Plum Sword Formation
 Hundun Sword Formation

See also
Kunlun Mountains
Kunlunquan
Kunlun Mountain Fist

Notes

Organizations in Wuxia fiction